Detroit has had at least two locations that were once called "Chinatown", with the first being in a downtown location at Third Avenue, Porter St and Bagley St, now the permanent site of the MGM Grand Casino and Interstate 75's Fisher Freeway. In the 1960s urban renewal efforts facilitated its move to Cass Avenue and Peterboro, which was also an opportunity for the Chinese business community to finally purchase property.

Much of the Metro Detroit Chinese community live in the Troy area; other Asians such as Koreans also are in great number there.

History

Although it is unclear when Chinese immigrants first arrived in Detroit, as newspapers in the 1800s did not differentiate between the different cultures of East Asia, it is known that in 1874, 14 Chinese washermen lived in the city. In 1905, Detroit's first two Cantonese chop suey restaurants opened near the Detroit River. However, because the city lacked a central ethnic enclave for Chinese residents, many found it difficult to participate in their cultural practices. An article in the Detroit Free Press in 1917 announced a new apartment building was to be the location of a new Chinatown at the intersection of Third and Porter, an intersection that no longer exists today. The population grew to 2,000 by the 1920s.
However, Chinatown was relocated to Cass and Peterboro sometime in the 1960s when the Detroit Housing Commission officially condemned Chinatown.  After decades of depopulation and decline, the last Chinese restaurant, "Chung's", was closed in the year 2000 after 40 years of service.  Although there is still a road marker indicating "Chinatown" and a mural commemorating the struggle for justice in the Vincent Chin case, few Chinese American establishments still operate within the City of Detroit. The Association of Chinese Americans Detroit Outreach Center, a small community center, serves a handful of new Chinese immigrants who still reside in the Cass Corridor.

Healthcare and elderly services
The Association of Chinese Americans operated a Chinatown clinic in the Cass Corridor Chinatown, which opened on September 9, 1973 in the On-Leong Merchants Association building. At the time of its opening, about 300 older Chinese American adults received services at the clinic. The clinic also serves individuals from other age groups. In 1985, the clinic moved to a renovated building on Peterboro Avenue. It closed in 1996 due to demographic changes.

The Detroit Drop-In Center, a center providing services to older Chinese Americans in the Cass Chinatown district, opened in October 1990. In January 2011 the main center moved to a new location in the Hannan House along Woodward Avenue.

Metro Detroit’s Asian and Chinese community is centered around Ann Arbor and Troy, which are about 15% Asian or higher.

See also
 History of the Chinese Americans in Metro Detroit
 Wong Wing v. United States
 Chinatown, Windsor

References

Asian-American culture in Metro Detroit
Detroit
Ethnic enclaves in Michigan